Herbert Gager (born 18 September 1969) is a retired Austrian international footballer who played as a defender for clubs in Austria and Greece. He is now head coach of TWL Elektra in the Regionalliga Ost (3rd level).

Club career
Born in Vienna, Gager began playing professional football for SK Rapid Wien in the Austrian Football Bundesliga.

In July 2000, Gager moved to Greece where he would spend two seasons with Skoda Xanthi F.C. playing the Greek Superleague and UEFA Cup. At age 32, he left Xanthi and returned to Austria to play for amateur side Hollabrunn.

International career
Gager made four appearances for the Austria national football team from 1991 to 1992.

Coaching career

Gager became head coach of Austria Wien for the remainder of the 2013–14 season after Nenad Bjelica was sacked on 16 February 2014. He had been head coach of the reserve team since 22 December 2011. Gager was sacked on 12 May 2014. He had lost to Sturm Graz 2–1 the day before and was subsequently knocked–out of third–place which would have given them a 2014–15 UEFA Europa League spot. He then became head coach of St. Pölten from 4 June 2014 until he was sacked on 7 October 2014. He had lost 10 of his 19 competitive matches.

Coaching record

References

External links

Profile at Rapidarchiv
Profile at Austria Wien Archiv

1969 births
Living people
Austrian footballers
Austria international footballers
SK Rapid Wien players
Wiener Sport-Club players
FC Admira Wacker Mödling players
FK Austria Wien players
SW Bregenz players
Xanthi F.C. players
Austrian Football Bundesliga players
Austrian football managers
FK Austria Wien managers
SKN St. Pölten managers
Association football defenders